Alec Potts (born 19 February 1996) is an Australian competitive archer. Potts made history at the 2016 Summer Olympics by bagging the country's first ever medal with a bronze in the men's team recurve.

Potts was selected to compete for the Australian squad at the 2016 Summer Olympics in Rio de Janeiro, shooting in both individual and team recurve tournaments. First, he recorded 666 points, 37 perfect tens, and 13 bull's eyes to take the twentieth seed heading to the knockout draw from the classification round, along with his team's cumulative score of 2,005. Sitting at fourth to move directly through the quarterfinals in the men's team recurve, Alec and his compatriots Ryan Tyack and London 2012 Olympian Taylor Worth confidently beat the Frenchmen with a 5–3 for the semifinals, before they were soundly beaten by the tournament favorites South Korea in straight sets (0–6). Bouncing back from their semifinal loss, the Australian trio held off a late reaction from China in the bronze medal match (6–2) to secure the country's first ever Olympic podium finish in a team archery event. In the men's individual recurve, Potts was unable to overcome local archer Bernardo Oliveira by the loud applause of the parochial crowd in the opening round, thereby eliminating him from the tournament 4–6.

References

External links
 
 
 
 

Australian male archers
Living people
Sportspeople from Melbourne
1996 births
Archers at the 2016 Summer Olympics
Olympic archers of Australia
Olympic medalists in archery
Olympic bronze medalists for Australia
Medalists at the 2016 Summer Olympics
People from Clayton, Victoria
Sportsmen from Victoria (Australia)